Charlotte Victoria Smith (born 1964, Leicester, England) is one of two main presenters of BBC Radio 4's Farming Today.

Early life
Smith grew up in Quorn, Leicestershire, the ancestral home of British fox hunting. She attended Loughborough High School]], where she was head girl. She studied English and Drama at the University of Kent from 1983–86.

She volunteered on BBC Radio Leicester.

Career
Smith was put on the BBC's Local Radio Reporters Scheme, then toured the local radio stations of Sussex, Cumbria and Devon. She then returned to Radio Leicester as a news reporter. At Radio Leicester she worked with Julian Worricker.

She worked on BBC national radio, on The World Tonight. More locally to Leicestershire, she became a reporter and sports presenter on East Midlands Today. Returning to national radio on BBC 5 Live, she was a producer, reporter and presenter.

Prior to Farming Today Smith worked as a reporter for You and Yours, the lunch-time consumer programme on Radio 4. She has also since been a television reporter on BBC1's Countryfile, until 2009, and returned as an occasional relief reporter from 2014.

Personal life
She has two children. She has a younger brother, Jeremy Smith.

References

External links
 Farming Today profile

Video clips
 Farm tourism in Leicestershire

Alumni of the University of Kent
BBC newsreaders and journalists
BBC Radio 4 presenters
People in agriculture
People educated at Loughborough High School
People from Quorn, Leicestershire
1964 births
Living people